Three ships of the Royal Navy have borne the name HMS Alligator, after the marine reptile, the alligator. A fourth ship was planned but later cancelled:

  was a 14-gun sloop launched in 1780. In April 1782 she was at Accra, in company with  when they destroyed a French storeship and captured several forts. On her way back to Britain on 26 June she encountered a French frigate off the Scilly Isles and a chase ensued and eventually a two-hour action in which she had three men killed and her captain and eleven others wounded. Eventually she struck to Fée. Between 1782-83 she was known as Alligator No.2. In October 1783 she became the packet ship Courrier de New-York, operating out of Lorient, and took up the Lorient-New York route in December. She was transferred to the Régie de Paquebots in May 1787 and used on the Le Havre-New York and Le Havre-Antilles routes. As a packet ship she had a crew of 47 men and was armed with sixteen 6-pounder guns. She was put up for sale in December 1788 and in January 1789 she was sold at Havre to Sr. Ruellen. In 1794 she was renamed Alligator. 
  was a 28-gun sixth rate launched in 1787 and sold in 1814.
  was a 28-gun sixth rate launched in 1821, hulked in December 1846 as a hospital and storeship at Hong Kong until struck there in October 1865.
HMS Alligator was to have been a wooden screw corvette. She was laid down in 1860, but cancelled in 1863.

Citations

References
 
 
 

Royal Navy ship names